Familia moderna (English: Modern Family) is a Chilean television series based on the American sitcom Modern Family which aired on ABC. It is produced and broadcast by Mega since December 3, 2015, starring Patricio Contreras, Mariana Loyola, Nicolás Saavedra and Álvaro Escobar in the lead roles.

Cast 
 Patricio Contreras as José "Pepe" Luis Gallo
 Álvaro Escobar as Juan Pablo "Lete" Letelier
 Mariana Loyola as Paula Gallo
 Nicolás Saavedra as Gustavo "Gus" Gallo
 Mario Soto as Fernando "Feña" Navarro
 Nidyan Fabregat as Sara "Sarita" Astudillo
 Valeska Díaz as Laura Letelier Gallo
 Ian Morong as Luis García "Chito" Astudillo
 Rosita Vial as Javiera "Javi" Letelier Gallo
 Luca Yaconi as Luca Letelier Gallo
 Antonella Castillo as Antonia "Anto" Gallo Prieto
 María Izquierdo as Tete Gallo

References

External links 
  

Modern Family
Chilean television sitcoms
Mega (Chilean TV channel) original programming
2015 Chilean television series debuts
2016 Chilean television series endings
Spanish-language television shows
Television series about families
Television series by 20th Century Fox Television
Chilean television series based on American television series